Homocystine is a chemical compound consisting of two homocysteine molecules joined by a disulfide bond. Its relationship with homocysteine is analogous to the relationship between cystine and cysteine.

References

Organic disulfides
Amino acids